Pizzicato Five Remixis 2000 is a 2000 Pizzicato Five remix album.

Track listing
 "The Groove Room Suite: a. Love Again / b. Darlin' Of Discotheque " - 9:11
 "Roma (Corso Edit)" - 1:26
 "Tout, Tout, Pour Ma Cherie (I [HEART] Kiss & Kids Mix)" - 3:20
 "One, Two, Three, Four, Five, Six, Seven, Eight, Nine, Ten Barbie Dolls (Ken's Old Aiwa Mix)" - 6:25
 "Darlin' Of Discotheque (Bongo A Go Go Mix)" - 5:35
 "A Perfect World (A Night At Organ B. Mix)" - 4:40
 "Jolly Bubbly Lovely (Cubis Tout-jour Mix)" - 5:12

Pizzicato Five albums
2000 remix albums